Ophyiulus pilosus is a species of millipede in the family Julidae. It is found in North America.

Subspecies
These four subspecies belong to the species Ophyiulus pilosus:
 Ophyiulus pilosus brevispinosus Loksa, 1962 c g
 Ophyiulus pilosus etruscus Verhoeff, 1932 c g
 Ophyiulus pilosus major Bigler & Verhoeff, 1929 c g
 Ophyiulus pilosus populi Verhoeff, 1932 c g
Data sources: i = ITIS, c = Catalogue of Life, g = GBIF, b = Bugguide.net

References

Further reading

 

Julida
Articles created by Qbugbot
Animals described in 1843